The 2007 Holiday Cup was the ninth edition of the women's water polo competition, held in the Belmont Plaza Pool in Long Beach, United States. The tournament took place from December 5 to December 9, 2007. The tournament served as a preparation for the 2008 Summer Olympics qualifiers (with the exception of the United States and the Netherlands who had already qualified).

Squads

Victoria Brown
Nikita Cuffe
Katie Finucane
Kate Gynther
Fiona Hammond
Bronwen Knox
Alicia McCormack
Sarah Mills
Jane Moran
Melissa Rippon
Rebecca Rippon
Jenna Santoromito
Mia Santoromito
Sophie Smith
Head coach: Greg McFadden

Krystina Alogbo
Johanne Begin
Joëlle Békhazi
Alison Braden
Cora Campbell
Tara Campbell
Emily Csikos
Whynter Lamarre
Sandra Lizé
Katrina Monton
Dominique Perreault
Rachel Riddell
Christine Robinson
Rosanna Tomiuk
Head coach: Patrick Oaten

Annalisa Bosello
Silvia Bosurgi
Elisa Casanova
Marta Colaiocco
Teresa Frassinetti
Eleonora Gay
Elena Gigli
Tania di Mario
Martina Miceli
Maddalena Musumeci
Francesca Pavan
Cinzia Ragusa
Erzsebet Valkai
Manuela Zanchi
Head coach: Mauro Maugeri

Iefke van Belkum
Gillian van den Berg
Daniëlle de Bruijn
Mieke Cabout
Rianne Guichelaar
Biurakn Hakhverdian
Marieke van den Ham
Noeki Klein
Lana Mandjes
Ilse van der Meijden
Meike de Nooy
Alette Sijbring
Yasemin Smit
Nienke Vermeer
Head coach: Robin van Galen

Olla Belyaeva
Olga Botynov
Yulia Gaufler
Evgenia Ivanova
Sofia Konukh
Ekaterina Kyznestova
Ekaterina Pantyulina
Ekaterina Prokofyna
Evgeniya Protsenko
Natalia Shepelina
Elena Smurova
Evgenia Soboleva
Valentina Vorontsova
Alena Vylegzhanina
Head coach: Aleksandr Kleymenov

Betsey Armstrong
Patty Cardenas
Kami Craig
Erika Figge
Molly Hayes
Jamie Hipp
Natalie Golda
Alison Gregorka
Heather Petri
Jessica Steffens
Moriah van Norman
Brenda Villa
Lauren Wenger
Elsie Windes
Head coach: Guy Baker

Preliminary round
December 5, 2007

December 6, 2007

December 6, 2007

December 7, 2007

December 8, 2007

Standings

Final round

5th/6th place match
December 9, 2007

Bronze medal match
December 9, 2007

Gold medal match
December 9, 2007

Final ranking

Individual awards
Most Valuable Player

External links
USA Waterpolo.org

References

Holiday Cup
Holiday Cup
H
H
2007 in American women's sports